Sgt Per Bergsland (17 January 1918 – 9 June 1992) was a Norwegian fighter pilot and POW in the German POW camp Stalag Luft III and one of only three men to escape to freedom in the "Great Escape".

Sports career
During the 1930s Bergsland competed in orienteering, representing the club IL Heming. In 1939 he placed second at the individual Norwegian championship in orienteering held at Modum. He was born in Bærum, but resided at Ullernåsen.

World War II
Per Bergsland received training as a pilot in Canada. He transferred to the RAF in 1942, where he was assigned to fly with a combat unit. As a member of No. 332 Squadron RAF stationed at North Weald airfield, Bergsland's Supermarine Spitfire Mk.Vb, (serial no AB269, coded AH:D) was shot down by a German Focke-Wulf Fw 190 during the Dieppe Raid on 19 August 1942. After arriving at the POW camp, he gave his name as "Peter Rockland" (Per = Petrus, meaning rock in Greek, and Berg meaning mountain or rock in Norwegian), in order to protect his family in Norway from German persecution.

In what later became known as the "Great Escape", he was escapee #43 among the 76 prisoners of war who managed to escape from the camp via tunnel with another Norwegian pilot, escapee #44 Jens Müller,

Bergsland and Müller made it to the nearby town of Sagan, where they caught a train to Stettin in Germany (now: Szczecin, Poland). At the port, the pair were snuck onto a neutral Swedish ship by friendly sailors and made it to the safety of Gothenburg. There, they entered the British consulate, who arranged travel by train to Stockholm, where they were flown to Scotland from the Bromma airport. From there they were sent by train to London and shortly afterwards to 'Little Norway' in Canada.

In total, only three POWs from Stalag Luft III made it to neutral countries and freedom.

The third escapee was the Dutchman Bram van der Stok, who crossed most of occupied Europe and escaped to Spain with the help of the French resistance.

The remaining 73 escapees were captured. Adolf Hitler wanted to execute them all, but Hermann Göring persuaded him not to: in the end, fifty were shot as an example. The remaining 23 were held in the custody of the Gestapo before being sent off to other camps. 17 were returned to Stalag Luft III, four were sent to Sachsenhausen, and two to Colditz Castle.

Postwar career
In 1946, Per Bergsland began as a pilot in Fred Olsen Air Transport. He later became Chief Pilot and Operational Manager. He became CEO of Fred Olsen Air Transport in 1968 and CEO of regional airline Widerøe from 1970 to 1981.

See also 
 The Great Escape
Tre kom tilbake
History of Widerøe

References

Related reading
 Carroll, Tim (2004) The Great Escaper (Mainstream Publishing) 
 Brickhill, Paul (1950) The Great Escape (W. W. Norton & Company) 
 Burgess, Alan (1990) The Longest Tunnel (Bloomsbury Publishing) 
 Durand, Arthur A (1989) Stalag Luft III (Patrick Stephens Ltd)

External links
Museum of Allied Prisoners of War Martyrdom

1918 births
1992 deaths
Norwegian Army Air Service personnel of World War II
Norwegian World War II pilots
Norwegian Royal Air Force pilots of World War II
Shot-down aviators
Norwegian prisoners of war in World War II
World War II prisoners of war held by Germany
Norwegian escapees
Participants in the Great Escape from Stalag Luft III
Norwegian airline chief executives
Norwegian orienteers
Male orienteers
Norwegian expatriates in Canada
People from Bærum
Businesspeople from Oslo
20th-century Norwegian businesspeople